Rush Clark (October 1, 1834 – April 29, 1879) was a nineteenth-century politician and lawyer from Iowa, who died on the floor of Congress in 1879.

Biography
Born in Schellsburg, Pennsylvania, Clark attended common schools and a local academy in Ligonier, Pennsylvania as a child. He graduated from Jefferson College in 1853, studied law and was admitted to the bar the same year, commencing practice in Iowa City, Iowa.

He was a member of the Iowa House of Representatives from 1860 to 1864, serving as Speaker of the House in 1863 and 1864, served on the staff of Governor Samuel J. Kirkwood in 1861 and 1862 and aided in the organization of volunteer regiments from Iowa during the Civil War. Clark was a trustee of the University of Iowa from 1862 to 1866, was again a member of the Iowa House of Representatives in 1876.

In 1876, he was elected as a Republican to represent Iowa's 5th congressional district in the United States House of Representatives.  He was re-elected two years later.  However,  on April 29, 1879, near the beginning of the first session of his second term, he died suddenly on the floor of the House, reportedly suffering an attack of meningitis.  He was interred in Oakland Cemetery in Iowa City.

See also
List of United States Congress members who died in office (1790–1899)

References

External links 

1834 births
1879 deaths
Iowa lawyers
Washington & Jefferson College alumni
Politicians from Iowa City, Iowa
People from Westmoreland County, Pennsylvania
People of Iowa in the American Civil War
Speakers of the Iowa House of Representatives
Union (American Civil War) political leaders
Deaths from meningitis
Republican Party members of the United States House of Representatives from Iowa
19th-century American politicians
19th-century American lawyers
Neurological disease deaths in Washington, D.C.
Infectious disease deaths in Washington, D.C.